Nev Munro (22 July 1927 – 31 August 2003) was a Canadian basketball player. He competed in the men's tournament at the 1948 Summer Olympics.

References

1927 births
2003 deaths
Canadian men's basketball players
Olympic basketball players of Canada
Basketball players at the 1948 Summer Olympics
Basketball players from Vancouver
UBC Thunderbirds basketball players